Johan Grebongo (born January 18, 1994) is a Central African professional basketball player for FC Mulhouse of the LNB Pro B.

International career 
Grebongo represents Central African Republic in international competition. He competed for his country at AfroBasket 2013 and AfroBasket 2015 under head coach Aubin-Thierry Goporo.

References

External links 
Johan Grebongo at Eurobasket.com
Johan Grebongo at RealGM
French League profile

1994 births
Living people
BCM Gravelines players
Central African Republic expatriate sportspeople in France
Central African Republic men's basketball players
Centers (basketball)
Expatriate basketball people in France
People from Bangui
Power forwards (basketball)